Pam Birdsall is a Canadian politician. Birdsall was elected to the Nova Scotia House of Assembly in the 2009 provincial election. She represented the electoral district of Lunenburg as a member of the New Democratic Party until her defeat in the 2013 election.

References

Year of birth missing (living people)
Living people
Nova Scotia New Democratic Party MLAs
Women MLAs in Nova Scotia
21st-century Canadian politicians
21st-century Canadian women politicians